The discography of the South Korean-Chinese boy band Exo consists of seven studio albums (five of which have been reissued under different titles), seven extended plays, four live albums and twenty-eight singles. Exo was formed by the Korean entertainment company SM Entertainment in 2011, and formerly consisted of twelve members separated into two sub-groups, Exo-K and Exo-M, releasing the same music simultaneously in both Korean and Mandarin in South Korea and China, respectively. The group's first release, the extended play Mama, was released in April 2012. The album topped Korean music charts on its release. With the release of Don't Mess Up My Tempo in November 2018, Exo became the first South Korean artist who debuted in the 21st century to sell 10 million albums cumulatively.

In 2021, Exo became "sextuple million sellers", meaning the band has sold over one million copies apiece for six different albums. Since their debut in 2012, the group has sold 23.8 million downloads as of December 2017, and more than 11.9 million physical albums as of August 2019, in South Korea.

Albums

Studio albums

Reissues

Live albums

Extended plays

Singles

Other charted songs

Soundtrack appearances
Note: For individual member's Soundtrack appearances, see their articles.

Music videos

See also
 List of songs recorded by Exo
 Exo-CBX discography
 Exo-SC discography
 Lay Zhang discography
 Chen discography
 Baekhyun discography

Notes

References

External links
  

Discographies of South Korean artists
K-pop music group discographies
Exo